Falkenberg is a German locality (Ortsteil) within the borough (Bezirk) of Lichtenberg, Berlin. Until 2001, it was part of the borough of Hohenschönhausen.

History
The settlement, inhabited by farmers from the Barnim, was first mentioned in 1370 on a document of Otto V, Duke of Bavaria. Until 1920, it was a municipality of Niederbarnim district, merged into Berlin with the "Greater Berlin Act".

Geography
Situated in northeastern suburb of Berlin, Falkenberg is bounded by the Brandenburger municipality of Ahrensfelde, in Barnim district. It borders with the Berliner localities of Wartenberg, Neu-Hohenschönhausen and Marzahn (in Marzahn-Hellersdorf).

Transport
Falkenberg is not directly served by the S-Bahn, but the station of Berlin-Ahrensfelde (line S7) is not too far from the settlement. The tramway terminal stop "Falkenberg" (lines M4 and M17), located in Neu-Hohenschönhausen, also serves the locality. The Bus line 197  crosses Falkenberg and links it to this two stops.

Photogallery

References

External links

 Falkenberg page on www.berlin.de

Localities of Berlin
Falkenberg
Populated places established in the 1370s